Mary Koga (née Mary Hisako Ishii, August 10, 1920 – June 8, 2001) was a Japanese-American photographer and social worker in Chicago.

Life
Koga was born in Sacramento, California, on August 10, 1920, and had been an avid photographer since she was a child. She concentrated on social work, however, and received a BA in 1942 from the University of California at Berkeley and a Master's degree in 1947 from the University of Chicago School of Social Service Administration. During World War II, following the signing of Executive Order 9066, she was incarcerated in the internment camp at Tule Lake for a year because of her Japanese ethnicity.

From 1947 to 1969, she worked in the field of social work in Chicago, starting out as a case worker and eventually teaching as an Assistant Professor for Field Work at the University of Chicago, School of Social Service Administration, 1960–1969.

Koga then concentrated on photography, studied at the IIT Institute of Design and received a MFA from the School of the Art Institute of Chicago in 1973. She then went on to teach photography at Columbia College Chicago for seven years.

Mary Koga died in Chicago on June 8, 2001.

Photography

Koga's photographic work consists mainly of three distinct series.

The Floral Forms series was begun in 1972 and went on into the 1990s. Done in both color as well as black and white, the images are delicate close-ups of mostly single flower heads, artfully arranged in the studio with tightly controlled lighting. 
On occasion, she over exposed and used multiple exposure to emphasise the structure and/or color. Comparison has been made with the flower paintings of Georgia O'Keeffe.

In parallel, between 1972 and 1980, Koga went to rural Alberta to work on the series The Hutterites. Her images show the members of the isolated religious community, who in many cases have been photographed for the first time, with great openness, sympathy and a touch of humor. While highly constructed and posed, her portraits capture people who are happy within their surroundings, yet emphasising how different and alien they are within modern society. The chaste lifestyle is not only palpable from the quaint, old fashioned dress the Hutterites wear but also in interiors and still life images of sober displays of kettles or bread.

Koga's third big project is closely linked to both, her ethnicity and her former concern with social work. She concentrated on the elderly first generation of Japanese immigrants, her parents' generation, in black and white as well as color photos. Done over several decades from the 1970s to the 1990s, the Portrait of the Issei in Illinois series is much more relaxed than the Hutterite portraits. Koga was obviously at ease with these people, and documented their twilight years at the day care facility and the Senior Citizens Work Center of the Japanese American Service Committee (JASC) and at Heiwa Terrace, a Japanese American senior residence, both located in Chicago.

References

 Mary Koga Photograph Collection
 Holdings at the Museum of Contemporary Photography, Chicago 
 Holdings at the Art Institute of Chicago
 Gerhard Bissell, Koga, Mary, in: Allgemeines Künstlerlexikon, vol. 80, 2013 (in preparation).

1920 births
2001 deaths
20th-century American photographers
American people of Japanese descent
Japanese-American internees
University of California, Berkeley alumni
University of Chicago School of Social Service Administration alumni
20th-century American women photographers